Grzegorz Cebula (born May 30, 1981), better known by his stage name C-BooL, is a Polish DJ and record producer.

Career
His career began in 1998 as a local DJ. The first popular songs in Polish radio were "Would You Feel" and "House Babe". At this time he adopted his stage name. Later, in 2010 he released with singer Isabelle the song "Body & Soul".

In 2016 the single "Never Go Away" was published. The track charted not only in Poland, but also in several other European countries and became his breakthrough song, receiving in Poland a diamond certification as well as a number-one position in Polish airplay charts.

"Never Go Away" as well as "Magic Symphony" were both awarded at the Eska Music Awards. The follow-up singles "DJ Is Your Second Name", "Wonderland" or "Fire In My Head" also were successful.

Discography

Album 
 8 Years (2011)

Singles

Remixes

Awards and nominations

References

Living people
1981 births
Polish DJs
Polish record producers
People from Pyskowice